In mathematics, the infinity Laplace (or  -Laplace) operator is a 2nd-order partial differential operator, commonly abbreviated . It is alternately defined by

or

The first version avoids the singularity which occurs when the gradient vanishes, while the second version is homogeneous of order zero in the gradient. Verbally, the second version is the second derivative in the direction of the gradient. In the case of the infinity Laplace equation , the two definitions are equivalent.

While the equation involves second derivatives, usually (generalized) solutions are not twice differentiable, as evidenced by the well-known Aronsson solution .  For this reason the correct notion of solutions is that given by the viscosity solutions.

Viscosity solutions to the equation  are also known as infinity harmonic functions. More recently, viscosity solutions to the infinity Laplace equation have been identified with the payoff functions from randomized tug-of-war games. The game theory point of view has significantly improved the understanding of the partial differential equation itself.

Discrete version and game theory

A defining property of the usual -harmonic functions is the mean value property. That has a natural and important discrete version: a real-valued function  on a finite or infinite graph  is discrete harmonic on a subset  if 
 
for all . Similarly, the vanishing second derivative in the direction of the gradient has a natural discrete version:

.

The importance of this example lies in the following.

Consider a bounded open set  with smooth boundary , and a continuous function . Instead, as it turns out, one should take the continuum graph with all edges of length at most , mentioned above.

,

For the -case, we need game theory. There are two players, in each turn they flip a fair coin, and the winner can move the token to any neighbour of the current location. The game ends when the token reaches  at some time  and location , at which point the first player gets the amount  from the second player. Therefore, the first player wants to maximize , while the second player wants to minimize it. If both players play optimally (which has a well-defined meaning in game theory), the expected payoff  to the first player is a discrete infinity harmonic function, as defined above.

There is a game theory approach to the p-Laplacian, too, interpolating between simple random walk and the above random tug-of-war game.

Sources

.

Differential operators
Elliptic partial differential equations